The William Little Foundation is a London-based charity operating internationally.

Named in honour of William Little, the English surgeon who described what became known as 'Little's disease', a spastic paralysis of both lower limbs which then became known as infantile cerebral palsy. The charity, founded in 1990 originally as The Little Foundation by the late Ian Dawson-Shepherd, has as its primary object initiating and funding research into the causes of neurodevelopmental disorders, in particular the causes and prevention of cerebral palsy, the most severe of these disorders which also includes autism, dyslexia, epilepsy, deafness, blindness and learning difficulties.  It does this by supporting world-class basic research, hosting multi-disciplinary workshops and conferences, and providing a forum for the exchange of ideas and best practice across all parts of the UK’s cerebral palsy (CP) sector.

On 4 November 2009, Lord Hameed, the charity's president, tabled a motion in the House of Lords asking the Government what measures have been taken to prevent cerebral palsy which now costs the NHS £4 billion every year. The total annual cost of brain disorders (covering 19 groups of disorders) has been estimated to be €798 billion for the EU alone.

In September 2020, the William Little Foundation published "Cerebral Palsy: causes and prevention", a review of the state of CP research around the world, highlighting work that significantly enhanced our understanding CP but also identifying gaps in research activity where it was felt resources could be applied that would accelerate our ability to combat this devastating condition. Much of this concern centres on the commonly-held view of CP as a comparatively ‘rare’ condition, meaning that research investment is significantly less than for conditions with higher incidence and prevalence. While CP’s incidence is estimated to afflict between 1.5 and 4 babies in every 1,000, no one knows this for certain as there are no universally consistent means of diagnosing CP or reporting its incidence in either the developed or developing worlds.

This ‘rarity’ argument also ignores the disproportionate social cost that is CP’s legacy: the condition is lifelong and frequently involves 24-hour care for those affected. National social-/health-care budgets and those of medical insurance companies for those not supported by a national health service continue to be stretched by the need for ever-increasing provision: CP costs the UK alone well over £1.6 billion every year. Yet the amount invested annually on research by government and other charities is worryingly small: the figure for the UK is less than £5 million, 0.23% of research funding. The UK is not alone in this – the report also reveals a similar picture of cost : investment disparity globally.

Research
The charity's most recent research projects include:
Autism spectrum disorder in children with and without epilepsy
Defining and classifying cerebral palsy
Clinical and MRI correlates of cerebral palsy

See also
Autism
Cerebral palsy
Attention deficit hyperactivity disorder

References

External links
Official website 

Health charities in the United Kingdom
Organizations established in 1990
Cerebral palsy organizations
Organizations for children with health issues